Ab Ruk Online is a Thai drama series that aired on Channel 3 that stars Ann Thongprasom, Peter Corp Dyrendal, Prin Suparat, and Kimberly Ann Voltemas under Thong Entertainment. Ratings for the drama was considered solid, although the numbers spanning between only 4 and 6 percent. The drama proved to be a massive success in the mainland with social media coverage. With the highest ratings rate on the last week aired.

Synopsis
Awatsaya (Ann Thongprasom) is a tough boss who secretly falls in love with Pranont, (Prin Suparat) her new subordinate. In order to maintain her image as a "boss" she uses an online chat program to secretly investigate and court Pranont using the alias "Khun Ab Ruk" meaning 'Miss Secret Love.'

As their love begins to bloom she accidentally reveals her secret to Lipda (Peter Corp Dyrendal) the handsome yet insidious Managing Director of the company. After learning Awatsaya's secret he helps her move on with Pranont, but later on falls in love with her himself. Meanwhile, Pribprao (Kimberly Ann Voltemas) pretends to be the real "Khun Ab Ruk," which further complicates the web of love.

Cast

Main Cast
Ann Thongprasom as Awasaya
Peter Corp Dyrendal as Lipda
Mark Prin Suparat as Pranon
Kimberly Ann Voltemas as Pribprao

Supporting Cast
Angie Hastings as Jarawee/Jan
Pokchat Tiemchai as Roonglada
Tuk Boriboon Junreung as Ruj
Sumonthip Leungutai|Kubkib Sumonthip Leungutai as Lilly
Sriphan Cheuanchomboon as Sandy
Ekkachai Euasangkomsret as Saranyu
Em Apinun Prasertwattanakul as Ongsa
Sarocha Watitapun|Tao Sarocha Watitapun as Poom
Pratthana Sutchukorn as Prim
Daraneenuch Pho-thi-piti as Preaw
Arnant Boonnark as Peera
Yodmanu Pamornmontri as Pod
Pimonwan Hoonthongkham as Waew
Sineenart Pho-thiwase as Yai Aroon
Napat Choomchittree as Hoon Kheun
Chanathip Pisutsereewong as Phoom
Peter Thanasuth as Matt
Corner Warithnant as James
Junya Thanasawarngkul as Phen
Chalermpol Thi-khampornteerawong as Sahus

Ratings

International broadcast

References

Thai television soap operas
2015 Thai television series debuts
2015 Thai television series endings
Channel 3 (Thailand) original programming
Thai-language television shows